Classic X-Men, originally titled X-Men Classics and later retitled X-Men Classic, is a reprint comic book series published by Marvel Comics. The first volume was a limited series which collected stories from the Roy Thomas/Neal Adams/Tom Palmer run on X-Men (originally published in 1969). The second volume was an unlimited series and reprinted stories from the All-New All-Different X-Men era (originally published in 1975). Both volumes frequently supplemented the reprinted stories with new material. The series lasted 110 issues.

History
The first volume was three issues published in 1983. Each issue was 48 pages with no ads (as compared to the industry standard of 32 pages with 9 pages of ads) and printed on high quality Baxter paper instead of the standard newsprint. The series reprinted X-Men #57-63 (necessitating that the stories from issues #59 and 61 be split across two issues) with new gatefold covers, opening pages which served to summarize the events of previous issues, and a foreword by John Byrne. The new material reunited original writer Roy Thomas and original inker Tom Palmer, but penciller Neal Adams was replaced by Mike Zeck.

The second volume was launched in 1986, reprinting the "All-New, All-Different" era of X-Men. Specifically, it reprinted Giant-Size X-Men #1 and Uncanny X-Men #94-206, with the exceptions of #106, 110, 141 and 142. The first 27 issues have various edits and new pages added to tie in with then-current continuity. The new material is often drawn by artists other than those who drew the original story but always written by the writer of the original stories, Chris Claremont. The first 44 issues have new backup stories further delving into and explaining the original stories, mostly written by Chris Claremont or Ann Nocenti and drawn by John Bolton. After Classic X-Men #45, the series was retitled X-Men Classic and from then solely reprinted material from the original Uncanny X-Men series.

The series also included new covers and frontispieces produced by artists such as Art Adams (issues #1-16, 18-23), Steve Lightle (#30-42, 44-52), Mike Mignola (#57-70), and Adam Hughes (issues #71-79).

Collected editions

Trade paperbacks

External links
A brief history of comics in the 1980s during which the Classic X-Men issues were printed
The Comic Book Database

X-Men titles
1986 comics debuts